The Flag of Brzeg is a town flag of the Polish town of Brzeg, adopted on the basis from the design from 21 December 1978. All uniforms and signs with the current flag have been so from 28 March 2008.

History

The three-anchor symbol in the centre of the flag is identical to the Coat of Arms of Brzeg. The symbol in the centre of the flag has its origins tracing back from the foundation of Brzeg in 1248, when the symbol was imprinted on the town seal and coins. The symbol is also found on the location prerogative of the Silesian dukes, such as that of Henry III the White in 1250, and so the symbol stayed from then on. The symbol underlines the town's history, based around the town's harbour on the River Odra; the Latin name for the town Alta Ripa is Latin for "High Bank". In 2015 Śląsk Wrocław was fined by UEFA because fans displayed a flag with a neo-Nazi symbol, which turned out to be the flag of Brzeg.

References

Brzeg County
Flags of cities in Poland